James Clabby Townsend (2 February 1945 – 19 October 2020) was a Scottish professional footballer who played for St Johnstone, Middlesbrough, Heart of Midlothian, and Morton. He made four appearances for the Scotland national team during a 1967 overseas tour that the Scottish Football Association decided in October 2021 to reclassify as full internationals. In 1976, he played in the National Soccer League with London City and Toronto Italia.

In 1977, he served as the head coach for Windsor Stars in the National Soccer League. In early 1978, the Windsor Stars dismissed him from his post.

Townsend died on 19 October 2020, at the age of 75.

References

1945 births
2020 deaths
Association football midfielders
Scottish footballers
St Johnstone F.C. players
Middlesbrough F.C. players
Heart of Midlothian F.C. players
Greenock Morton F.C. players
London City players
Toronto Italia players
Scottish Football League players
English Football League players
Scottish expatriate footballers
Expatriate soccer players in Canada
Scottish expatriate sportspeople in Canada
Footballers from Greenock
Canadian National Soccer League coaches
Canadian National Soccer League players
Scotland international footballers